Ipomopsis polycladon is a species of flowering plant in the phlox family known by the common name manybranched ipomopsis. It is native to much of the western United States and northern Mexico, where it grows in sandy soils such as those of the deserts. This is an annual herb producing a number of horizontal red stems extending outward from the short central stem. Leaves appear at the ends and axils of branches. Each leaf is multilobed, and mostly green but often red-tipped, and less than 2 centimeters long. Stems and leaves are covered with woolly glandular hairs. The long stem branches bear inflorescences of leaflike bracts which are green with sharp-pointed red tips, and tiny white flowers a few millimeters across.

External links
Jepson Manual Treatment
Photo gallery

polycaldon
Flora of North America